Helen Rachel Slater (born December 15, 1963) is an American actress and singer-songwriter. She played the title character in the 1984 film Supergirl, and returned to the 2015 TV series of the same title, this time as Supergirl's adoptive mother, Eliza Danvers. In the intervening years, she starred in several films including The Legend of Billie Jean (1985), Ruthless People (1986), The Secret of My Success (1987), and City Slickers (1991).  She additionally found work as an actress in television, and stage projects, including three guest appearances on the series Smallville (2007–2010).

Early life
Slater was born in Bethpage, New York. She is Jewish. Her parents, Alice Joan (née Citrin), a lawyer and nuclear disarmament peace activist based in New York City, and Gerald Slater, a television executive, divorced in 1974. She has a brother, David, who is a lawyer in New York City. Slater attended Great Neck South High School and then transferred to the High School of Performing Arts from which she graduated in 1982.

A common misconception is that she is related to actor Christian Slater, who played her character's brother in The Legend of Billie Jean.

Film and television work

Filmography

Other works

Stage work

In 1987, Slater co-founded the New York theater group, The Naked Angels, with Gina Gershon. In 1991, she also co-founded, with her husband, Robert Watzke, the L.A. based theater group The Bubalaires.

Slater appeared in two off-Broadway plays: "Almost Romance" and "Responsible Parties". She also starred in "The Big Deal" at the Pasadena Playhouse.

Music career
In 2003, she released the album, One of These Days, consisting of her original songs. The tracks were real-time recordings with Slater singing and playing piano, accompanied by six other musicians; no multitracking, editing, or dubbing was employed. In 2005, she released a second album, Crossword, which used the same recording approach as her first album. Both albums were produced by Phillip Swann. In 2008, Cortes Alexander recorded Slater's "Any Day Now" and "Love'll Come & Do Just That" on his album Swell.

Writing
In 2010, Slater wrote a Supergirl story titled "A Hero's Journey" which appeared in the fiftieth issue of the fifth volume of the Supergirl comic book.

Awards
In 1985, DC Comics named Slater as one of the honorees in the company's 50th anniversary publication Fifty Who Made DC Great for her work on the Supergirl film.

References

External links
 
 

1963 births
Living people
20th-century American actresses
20th-century American Jews
21st-century American actresses
21st-century American Jews
Actresses from New York (state)
American comics writers
American women singers
American film actresses
American stage actresses
American television actresses
American voice actresses
Fiorello H. LaGuardia High School alumni
Jewish American actresses
Jewish singers
People from Bethpage, New York
Singers from New York (state)
William A. Shine Great Neck South High School alumni